The twenty-seventh season of the Case Closed anime was directed by Yasuichiro Yamamoto and produced by TMS Entertainment and Yomiuri Telecasting Corporation. The series is based on Gosho Aoyama's Case Closed manga series. In Japan, the series is titled  but was changed due to legal issues with the title Detective Conan. The episodes' plot follows Conan Edogawa's daily adventures.

The episodes use seven pieces of theme music: three openings and four endings.

The second opening theme is Lie, Lie, Lie, by Maki Ohguro used for episodes 869 - 886.

The third opening theme is Everything OK!! by Cellchrome used for episodes 887 - 902 (season 28).

The first ending theme is YESTERDAY LOVE by Mai Kuraki and starts at episode 843 of season 26 and was used until episode 864 of season 27.

(This is also used for film 21: The Crimson Love Letter.)

The season began airing on April 29, 2017 through March 24, 2018 on Nippon Television Network System in Japan. The season was later collected and released in ten DVD compilations by Shogakukan between January 25, 2019 and November 22, 2019, in Japan. Crunchyroll began simulcasting the series in October 2014, starting with episode 754. 



Episode list

References

Season27
2017 Japanese television seasons
2018 Japanese television seasons